Riccardo Giraudi (born 14 November 1975 in Genoa) is the CEO of Giraudi Group.

Biography 
Riccardo Giraudi grew up in the Principality of Monaco before studying at the European Business School of London where he obtained a Bachelor in Business Administration in 1999.

Career 
In 2001, Riccardo Giraudi joined the family-owned company created by his father, Erminio Giraudi in the 1970's : Giraudi Group. The group is one of the European leader in meat import / export (40% veal, 30% beef, 10% pork).

While becoming the European leader in the import of hormone free American Black Angus in 2005, Riccardo Giraudi introduced Australian beef and became in 2014 the first importer of certified Japanese Kobe beef in Europe.

A few months later, Riccardo Giraudi launched the Jamon de Buey de Kobe, a Japanese Kobe beef ham with which he notably won the Wallpaper Design Award 2018, "Best Working Lunch" category.

Since 2005, Riccardo Giraudi also develops "luxury casual" and "fast casual" hospitality concepts, in Monaco, Paris and abroad.

Restaurants

Europe 

 Beefbar, Monaco
 Beefbar Butcher Shop, Monaco
 Song Qi, Monaco
 Mozza, Monaco
 Izakaya, Monaco
 Moshi Moshi, Monaco
 Cantinetta Antinori, Monaco
 Tiny Thaï, Monaco
 Grubers, Monaco
 Pizz'Aria, Monaco
 Babek Kebab, Monaco
 Naro's by Beefbar, Monaco
 Delovery, delivery service, Monaco
 Beefbar, Paris
 Anahi, with a menu created by Mauro Colagreco, Paris
 FYA, Paris with the singer Gims
 Le Comptoir de Nicole, Nice
 Beefbar on the Coast, Mykonos
 Beefbar Lou Pinet, Saint Tropez 
 Beefbar on the Beach, Malta
 Beefbar in the City, Malta
 Beefbar Le Coucou, Meribel
 Beefbar Astir Palace, Athens
 Beefbar Cala di Volpe, Porto Cervo
 Beefbar, Milan 
 Beefbar, Rome (opening 2023)
 Grubers, Luxembourg
 Beeftro, Luxembourg
 Le Petit Beefbar, London

America 

 Beefbar Polanco, Mexico 
 Beefbar Esencia, Riviera Maya 
 Beefbar Jardim, Sao Paulo with Felipe Massa
 Beefbar, New York (opening 2023)

Middle East & Africa 

 Beefbar, Dubai 
 Le Petit Beefbar, Dubai 
 Beefbar, Riyadh 
 Beefbar, Doha 
 Beefbar, North Coast

Asia 

 Beefbar Central, Hong Kong

Awards 
Since 2017, Beefbar Hong Kong is Michelin starred in the "Hong Kong & Macau Michelin Guide" "Guide Michelin Hong Kong & Macau".

Beefbar Paris is elected best steakhouse by Time Out., is ranked in the Top 50 of Monocle Restaurant Awards and won the RESTAURANT & BAR DESIGN AWARDS, in the "Heritage Building" category

Other activities 
Since 2007, Riccardo Giraudi is appointed Honorary Consul of Gabon in the Principality of Monaco.

References

External links 

 Riccardo Giraudi
 Giraudi Group
 Giraudi Meats

1975 births
Living people
Italian business executives
People from Genoa